Johan Evenepoel (Ninove, 25 January 1965) is a Belgian composer. Johan Evenepoel was educated at the Lemmensinstituut in Leuven, where he won several first prizes. After he graduated he worked for a while for the Belgian Army Orchestra of the Grenadiers. He currently teaches clarinet at several musical academies in Halle, Lennik and Brakel. Evenepoel has composed some eighty works, most are for wind orchestras like brass band, fanfare and wind band.

External links
Biography of Johan Evenepoel - Only available in Dutch

1965 births
Living people
Belgian composers
Male composers
Belgian male musicians
Belgian military musicians